North American International Livestock Exposition (NAILE) is a livestock show held each November in Louisville, Kentucky and lasts for two weeks. It is billed as the "world's largest all-breed, purebred livestock exposition", with nine major livestock divisions with competitors from the 48 contiguous states.  These divisions are beef cattle, Boer goats, dairy cattle, dairy goats, draft horses, quarter horses, llamas & alpacas, sheep, and swine. A PRCA rodeo, the North American Championship Rodeo, is also held.

Visitors from 15 countries attend the Expo. Many of these go to the event to acquire purebred livestock semen and embryos to export from the United States.  This makes the event attractive to American "seedstock producers".

The events are held at the Kentucky Exposition Center. The giant expo was established in 1974. It is produced by the Commonwealth of Kentucky under the guidance of the Kentucky State Fair Board.

See also

 List of attractions and events in the Louisville metropolitan area

References

External links
 North American International Livestock Exposition

Annual fairs
Events in Louisville, Kentucky
Recurring events established in 1974
Fairs in the United States
1974 establishments in Kentucky
Rodeo in the United States
November events
Kentucky State Fair